"Heading South" is a song by American singer-songwriter Zach Bryan. It was released on September 30, 2019, as a single from his second studio album Elisabeth, which was released on May 8, 2020. The song was written by Bryan, and produced by Leo Alba.

Content
The song was originally released in 2019, but in 2020, it garnered attention on the Internet, gaining over 30 million plays on Spotify. Bryan stated that he recorded the song behind his barracks when he served in the United States Navy.

Music video
The music video was shot in his Navy barracks on his phone. As of December 2021, the video has received over 18 million views.

Commercial performance
It reached number 27 on the Billboard Hot Rock & Alternative Songs chart dated March 13, 2021, becoming Bryan first entry. On November 4, 2021, the song obtained RIAA Gold certification.

Charts

Weekly charts

Year-end charts

Certifications

References

2019 singles
2019 songs
Warner Records singles
Zach Bryan songs